Múte Inequnaaluk Bourup Egede (born 11 March 1987) is a Greenlandic politician currently serving as the seventh prime minister of Greenland, a position he has held since April 2021. He has served as a member of the Inatsisartut, the parliament of Greenland, since 2015, and furthermore as chairman of the Inuit Ataqatigiit party since 2018.

Life and career 
Egede was born in Nuuk but grew up in Narsaq in southern Greenland. He attended high school in Qaqortoq before he in 2007 started studying Cultural and Social History at the University of Greenland. Between 2011 and 2012, he was the vice chairman of KISAQ, the Greenlandic Academic Student Society. He did not finish his studies, as he in 2013 dropped out to take over a family-owned fodder company run by his father.

In 2007, Egede was a member of the Greenlandic youth parliament, the Inuusuttut Inatsisartui, and from 2013 till 2015 chairman of the Inuusuttut Ataqatigiit, the youth wing of Inuit Ataqatigiit.

At the 2015 Danish general election, Egede was a candidate for the Folketing for Inuit Ataqatigiit. He received 2,131 votes, not enough for a seat in parliament.

Between 2016 and 2018, Egede served as Minister for Raw Material and the Labour Market, where he simultaneously – for three months in 2017 – was acting Minister of Communes, Hamlets, Outer Districts, Infrastructure and Housing.

On 1 December 2018 he was elected chair of Inuit Ataqatigiit, succeeding Sara Olsvig. He led the party to the 2021 Greenlandic general elections, where it, with 36.6% of the vote, became the largest party in parliament. With 3,380 personal votes, Egede was the candidate with the most personal votes in the elections, receiving upwards of 1,500 more than the sitting Prime Minister, Kim Kielsen of the Siumut party. On 16 April it was announced that IA had formed a coalition with Naleraq with a 10 member Naalakkersuisut; Atassut, which holds two seats, announced that while it would not enter a pro-independence coalition they would provide support to the coalition. Egede is the youngest ever Prime Minister of Greenland. He was confirmed as Prime Minister by the Inatsisartut on 23 April.

He formed a new government in April 2022.

Politics and ideology 
Egede is the chairman of Inuit Ataqatigiit, which is a democratic socialist political party in Greenland. Like the party, Egede is an advocate for Greenlandic independence.

Personal life 
Egede has 2 children with his former partner.

References

External links 

 Profile on the website of the Nordic Cooperation
 @MuteBEgede on Twitter

1987 births
Living people
21st-century Danish politicians
21st-century Greenlandic politicians
People from Nuuk
Inuit Ataqatigiit politicians
Greenlandic nationalists
Prime Ministers of Greenland